The Kh-59 Ovod ( Овод 'Gadfly'; AS-13 'Kingbolt') is a Russian TV-guided cruise missile with a two-stage solid-fuel propulsion system and 200 km range. The Kh-59M Ovod-M (AS-18 'Kazoo') is a variant with a bigger warhead and turbojet engine. It is primarily a land-attack missile but the Kh-59MK variant targets ships.

Development
The initial design was based on the Raduga Kh-58 (AS-11 'Kilter'), but it had to be abandoned because the missile speed was too high for visual target acquisition.

Raduga OKB developed the Kh-59 in the 1970s as a longer ranged version of the Kh-25 (AS-10 'Karen'), as a precision stand-off weapon for the Su-24M and late-model MiG-27's. The electro-optical sensors for this and other weapons such as the Kh-29 (AS-14 'Kedge') and KAB-500KR bombs were developed by S. A. Zverev NPO in Krasnogorsk.

It is believed that development of the Kh-59M started in the 1980s. Details of the Kh-59M were first revealed in the early 1990s.

Design
The original Kh-59 is propelled by a solid fuel engine, and incorporates a solid fuel accelerator in the tail. The folding stabilizers are located in the front of the missile, with wings and rudder in the rear. It is carried on an AKU-58-1 launch pylon.

The Kh-59ME has an external turbofan engine below the body just forward of the rear wings, but retains the powder-fuel accelerator. It also has a dual guidance system consisting of an inertial guidance system to guide it into the target area and a television system to guide it to the target itself.

The 36MT turbofan engine developed for the Kh-59M class of missiles is manufactured by NPO Saturn of Russia.

Target coordinates are fed into the missile before launch, and the initial flight phase is conducted under inertial guidance. An operator aboard the aircraft visually identifies the target and locks the missile onto it.

Operational history
Although the original Kh-59 could be carried by the MiG-27, Su-17M3, Su-22M4, Su-24M, Su-25 and Su-30 family if they carried an APK-9 datalink pod, it was only fielded on the Su-24M in Russian service. From 2008–2015, Russia delivered some 200 Kh-59 missiles to China for use on the Su-30MK2; deliveries may have included both Kh-59MK and Kh-59MK2 versions. The Kh-59MK2 has been test-fired by a Su-57 stealth fighter, during its 2018 Syrian deployment.

On 4 April 2022, during the Russian invasion of Ukraine, photographic evidence was published on Telegram channels that a Kh-59M missile was launched by the Russian Air Force at a grain silo near Mykolaiv, Ukraine. The missile was captured on CCTV as it was traveling to the target area.

On 16 August 2022, the Ukrainian Air Force confirmed over Social Media that Kh-59 missiles were used to strike an airbase in the Zhytomyr Oblast, the missiles being fired from towards the Belarusian border from what was believed to be Su-34 jets.

Variants

 Kh-59 (AS-13 'Kingbolt') – original version with dual solid-fuel rocket engines. First shown in 1991; exported as Kh-59 or Kh-59E.
 Kh-59M (AS-18 'Kazoo') – adds turbojet engine and larger warhead. Range 115 km.
 Kh-59ME – 200 km-range variant offered for export in 1999.
 Kh-59MK – 285 km-range anti-shipping variant with turbofan engine and ARGS-59 active radar seeker.
 Kh-59MK2 / Kh-69 (AS-22) – land attack variant of Kh-59MK (fire-and-forget), equipped with either a 320 kg penetrating or  pellet warhead. First unveiled at MAKS 2015.
 Kh-59M2 – Kh-59M/Kh-59MK with new TV/IIR seekers, reported in 2004.
 Kh-20 – possible name for nuclear-tipped variant carried by Su-27 family.
 Kh-59L – laser-guided variant that was developed.
 Kh-59T – TV guided instead laser guidance variant.
 Kh-59MKM – penetrator version that eliminated the seeker section and fitted a  warhead, able to penetrate 3 m of reinforced concrete.

Proposed development options for the Kh-59M/ME have included alternative payloads (including cluster munitions) but their current development status is unclear.

Operators

Current operators

 Algerian Air Force

 People's Liberation Army Air Force

 Indian Air Force

 Indonesian Air Force

 Royal Malaysian Air Force

 Russian Air Force

 Venezuelan Air Force

 Vietnam People's Air Force

Former operators

 Soviet Air Forces

See also
 AGM-130 TV-guided penetration missile
 AGM-84E Standoff Land Attack Missile
 AGM-62 Walleye II – TV-guided glide bomb with 83 km range
 Kh-37 variant of Kh-35U (AS-20 'Kayak') – 145 kg warhead, 250 km range
 Kh-58 (AS-11 'Kilter') – Raduga anti-radar missile, 120 km range
 Kh-35 (AS-20 'Kayak')

References

Bibliography
 

Kh-059
Kh-059
Anti-ship cruise missiles of Russia
Cold War air-to-surface missiles of the Soviet Union
Cruise missiles
Fire-and-forget weapons
Military equipment introduced in the 1980s
MKB Raduga products
Nuclear air-to-surface missiles
Nuclear cruise missiles of Russia
Nuclear cruise missiles of the Soviet Union
Television guided weapons